Lieutenant General Sir Anthony Richard Guy Mullens  (10 May 1936 – 27 November 2009) was a British Army officer who became Deputy Chief of the Defence Staff (Systems).

Military career
Educated at Eton College and the Royal Military Academy Sandhurst, Mullens was commissioned into the 4th/7th Royal Dragoon Guards in 1956. In 1972, as Chief of Staff of 8th Infantry Brigade, he handled the planning for Operation Motorman, which led to the removal of the barricades in Derry. He was given command of his Regiment, at that time based in Germany, in 1976. He was appointed Commander of 7th Armoured Brigade in 1980, Deputy Military Secretary in 1982 and General Officer Commanding 1st Armoured Division in 1985. He went on to be Assistant Chief of the Defence Staff (Operational Requirements) in 1987 and Deputy Chief of the Defence Staff (Systems) in 1989 before retiring in 1992.

He was also Colonel of the Royal Dragoon Guards.

In retirement he became an Associate of Varley Walker & Partners, a firm of consultants.

Family
In 1964 he married Dawn Pease; they had no children.

References

|-

1936 births
2009 deaths
British Army generals
Knights Commander of the Order of the Bath
Officers of the Order of the British Empire
People educated at Eton College
4th/7th Royal Dragoon Guards officers
Graduates of the Royal Military Academy Sandhurst
British military personnel of The Troubles (Northern Ireland)